Marc Rochester Sørensen (born 13 December 1992) is a Danish footballer who plays as an attacking midfielder for Östers IF.

Career

Club career
He played 24 matches and scored one goal when HB Køge played in the Danish Superliga in the 2011-12 season.

In 2012, Marc Rochester was selected for the player of year when he played for HB Køge.

In July 2013 he moved to FC Vestsjælland on a 3 years contract. On 20 November 2015 FC Vestsjælland went bankrupt, and on 13 February 2016 Rochester signed a contract with his former club HB Køge.

Personal life
Marc's younger brother, Lee Rochester Sørensen, is also a footballer.

References

External links 
 Danish national team profile 
 

1992 births
Living people
Danish men's footballers
Danish people of English descent
Danish people of Jamaican descent
Association football midfielders
Superettan players
Östers IF players
HB Køge players
FC Vestsjælland players
Silkeborg IF players
Danish Superliga players
Danish 1st Division players